Interesting Times is a 1994 novel by Terry Pratchett.

Interesting Times may also refer to:

Interesting Times (album), a 1989 album by High Tide
Interesting Times: The Secret of My Success, a 2002 Chinese documentary film

See also
"May you live in interesting times", an English expression, purportedly a translation of a Chinese curse